Victor von Richter (April 15, 1841 – October 8, 1891) was a German chemist and discovered the von Richter reaction.

Works 
 Chemie der Kohlenstoffverbindungen. Band 1: Die Chemie der Fettkoerper . Cohen, Bonn 1894  Digital edition by the University and State Library Düsseldorf 
 Chemie der Kohlenstoffverbindungen. Band 2: Carbocyclische und heterocyclische Verbindungen . Cohen, Bonn 1896 Digital edition by the University and State Library Düsseldorf
 V. v. Richter's Lehrbuch der anorganischen Chemie : mit 90 Holzschnitten u. 1 Spectraltaf. . 8. Aufl. / neu bearb. von H. Klinger Cohen, Bonn 1895 Digital edition by the University and State Library Düsseldorf
 Traité de chimie organique . Vol. 1&2 . éd. française trad. d'après la 11e éd. allemande, Béranger, Paris 1910 Digital edition by the University and State Library Düsseldorf

References

External links
 

1841 births
1891 deaths
19th-century German chemists
People involved with the periodic table